The United States Department of Labor Hall of Honor is in the Frances Perkins Building, 200 Constitution Ave., NW, Washington, D.C. It is a monument to honor Americans who have made a major contribution toward their country's workers; for example, by improving working conditions, wages, and quality of life.

Background
First proposed during the John F. Kennedy administration in 1962 as the Hall of Fame, the Hall of Honor was opened in 1988. Honorees are selected each year by a panel inside the Department of Labor. All have been recognized posthumously with the lone exception of 2012 inductee Dolores Huerta.

Inductees 

Its inductees include:

 1989 – Cyrus S. Ching
 1989 – John R. Commons
 1989 – Samuel Gompers
 1989 – John L. Lewis
 1989 – George Meany
 1989 – James P. Mitchell
 1989 – Frances Perkins
 1989 – A. Philip Randolph
 1990 – Eugene V. Debs
 1990 – Henry J. Kaiser
 1990 – Walter P. Reuther
 1990 – Robert F. Wagner
 1991 – Mary Anderson
 1991 – Philip Murray
 1992 – Sidney Hillman
 1992 – Mother Jones
 1993 – David Dubinsky
 1994 – George W. Taylor
 1995 – Arthur J. Goldberg
 1996 – William Green
 1997 – David A. Morse
 1998 – Cesar Chavez
 1999 – Terence V. Powderly
 2000 – Joseph A. Beirne
 2002 – 9/11 Rescue workers
 2002 – Jim Casey
 2003 – Paul Hall
 2003 – Milton Hershey
 2003 – Steve Young
 2004 – Peter J. McGuire
 2004 – Harley-Davidson: William S. Harley; Arthur Davidson; Walter Davidson; and William A. Davidson
 2005 – Robert Wood Johnson
 2005 – Peter J. Brennan
 2006 – Charles R. Walgreen
 2006 – Alfred E. Smith
 2007 – Adolphus Busch
 2007 – William B. Wilson
 2008 – John Willard Marriott
 2008 – Leonard F. Woodcock
 2010 – Justin Dart, Jr.
 2010 – Helen Keller
 2011 – The Workers of the Memphis sanitation strike
 2012 – The Pioneers of the Farm Worker Movement
 2012 – Rev. Addie Wyatt
 2012 – Tony Mazzocchi
 2012 – Mark Ayers
 2012 – Dolores Huerta
 2013 – Bayard Rustin
 2013 – Esther Peterson
 2014 – The Chinese Railroad Workers
 2015 – Ted Kennedy
 2016 – Frank Kameny
 2018 – Ronald Reagan
 2019 – Howard Jenkins Jr.
 2020 – Robert P. Griffin

External links 

 U.S. Department of Labor Hall of Honor
 AFSCME Sanitation Workers Honored at White House, Join ‘Labor Hall of Fame’
 Labor Department honors Harley

References

United States Department of Labor
Halls of fame in Washington, D.C.
1988 establishments in Washington, D.C.
Working-class culture in Washington, D.C.